USCGC Paul Clark (WPC-1106) is the sixth  cutter.  Like the previous five vessels she is homeported in Miami, Florida. She was delivered to the Coast Guard, for testing, on May 18, 2013.

Operational history

On September 13, 2013 the vessel repatriated 66 Cuban migrants to Bahia de Cabañas. The migrants had been intercepted in four separate operations over the preceding days. Smaller vessels had intercepted four different migrant vessels. The Coast Guard Public Affairs Office asserted that their interception of the migrant vessels saved lives because navigation between Cuba and Florida is so dangerous. The migrants were transferred to Paul Clark for repatriation to Cuba.

Namesake

The vessel is named after Paul Leaman Clark, who served as a fireman in the United States Coast Guard during World War II.
Clark was a landing boat engineer attached to  during the allied assault on a beach in French Morocco when the craft's two other crew members were wounded by a Luftwaffe fighter. For his courage he was awarded the Navy Cross.

References

Sentinel-class cutters
Ships of the United States Coast Guard
2012 ships
Ships built in Lockport, Louisiana